La Diva en Vivo is a live album released by Regional Mexican singer Jenni Rivera. It was recorded in Gibson Amphitheatre, Universal City, California in 2007. La Diva en Vivo  earned Rivera a nomination for the Best Ranchero Album at the 9th Annual Latin Grammy Awards.

Track listing
 Sufriendo a Solas 
 Popurri: Por un Amor/Cucurrucucu Paloma 
 La Diferencia 
 Inocente Pobre Amiga 
 Paloma Negra 
 Libro Abierto 
 Me Siento Libre 
 Brincos Dieras 
 Que Me Vas a Dar 
 De Contrabando 
 La Mentada Contestada 
 Navidad Sin Ti

Chart performance

References

2007 live albums
Fonovisa Records live albums
Jenni Rivera live albums
Spanish-language live albums
Jenni Rivera video albums
Fonovisa Records video albums